Colegio Diocesano Monseñor Miguel Ángel Alemán is an Argentine high school in the city of Ushuaia, Tierra del Fuego Province.

Curriculum
The school provides a multi-disciplinary education that includes three main disciplines: economy, humanities and natural science.

See also

 Education in Argentina
 List of schools in Argentina

External links
 , the school's official website

Educational institutions with year of establishment missing
Buildings and structures in Tierra del Fuego Province, Argentina
Education in Tierra del Fuego Province, Argentina
Secondary schools in Argentina
Ushuaia